Water Television Network is a Canadian English language licence-exempted Category B specialty channel broadcasting programming targeting water sport enthusiasts, including programming on sail boating adventures, scuba diving, fresh and saltwater angling, kayaking, camping, and more. The channel is owned by Ryan Kohler through Wild TV Inc.

History
The channel launched on July 16, 2020 on Shaw Direct in high-definition.

References

External links
 Office website

Television channels and stations established in 2020
Digital cable television networks in Canada
English-language television stations in Canada
2020 establishments in Canada
HD-only channels